Assis-sur-Serre is a commune in the department of Aisne in the Hauts-de-France region of northern France.

Geography
Assis-sur-Serre is located some 30 km southeast of Saint-Quentin and 15 km northwest of Laon.  It can be accessed by the D35 road from Remies in the west through the heart of the commune and the village and continuing to Pouilly-sur-Serre in the east. There is also the D351 road going north from the village and joining the D642 which continues north to Montigny-sur-Crecy. There is a network of country roads in the commune which is entirely farmland apart from the village.

The Serre river flows through the north of the commune forming part of the northern border but there are no other waterways in the commune other than a small loop off the Serre.

Neighbouring communes and villages

Administration

List of Mayors of Assis-sur-Serre

Population

Sites and Monuments

A Calvary in the middle of the village square.

Notable People linked to the commune
Louis Santos-Marriage, architect of the Assis-sur-Serre mill

Facilities
The village has land for motocross and a tennis court.

See also
Communes of the Aisne department

References

External links
Assis-sur-Serre on the old IGN website 
40000 bell towers website 
Assis-sur-Serre on Géoportail, National Geographic Institute (IGN) website 
Aßy on the 1750 Cassini Map

Communes of Aisne